Nomfundo Ngcobo (born 18 July 2000), known professionally  as Nomfundoh Moh is a South African singer. Born and raised in Ndwendwe, KwaZulu-Natal, her career  began at the age of 16 in 2016. Moh first gained recognition after releasing "Lilizela" in 2021, which received gold certification in South Africa.

Having signed a record deal with Universal Music, she rose to prominence with her debut studio album Amagama (2022), spawned with chart-topping single "Phakade Lami".

Career 
She enrolled at the University of KwaZulu-Natal a Bachelor of Social Worker Degree.

2020-2022: Amagama 
In September 2020, she began working on her debut studio album. In 2020, she signed a record deal with Universal Music South Africa. In February 2021, her breakthrough single "Lilizela" was released as album's lead single. The song was certified gold in South Africa.

In June 2021, album's second single "Umthwalo" was released. On October 7, 2021, her third single "Phakade Lami" featuring South African singer Ami Faku and Zimbabwean-born singer Sha Sha was released. It debuted at number 1 on Metro FM Top 40 Charts and number 4 on Most Popular Radio Singles. The song was certified 4× platinum in South Africa.

On January 28, 2022, her debut studio album Amagama was released. The album incorporated elements of Rnb, Traditional pop, and hip hop. Amagama peaked at number 7 on Spotify album's charts.

In early March 2022, Moh was featured by Apple Music on Africa Rising programme.

In April 13, she was named as the ambassador Equal Africa Ambassador by Spotify.

In May 2022, she was featured on Shay’na nge White Star campaign, which includes two dates. The first show was held  at  Johannesburg on 12 May, and last one in Durban on 21 May.

2023-present: Ugcobo 
In March 2023, Moh announced her upcoming second studio album Ugcobo and its lead single "Amalobolo" featuring Big Zulu. The song was released on March 10, 2023.

Artistry

Influence 
Moh cites Brenda Fassie, Ami Faku, Simmy, and Amanda Black as her major influences.

Discography 
 Amagama (2022)
 Ugcobo (2023)

Singles

As lead artist

Achievements

All Africa Music Awards 

!
|-
|rowspan="4"|2022
|Amagama
|Album of the Year
|
|rowspan="4"|
|-
|rowspan="2" |"Phakade Lami"
|Best Artist, Duo or Group in African RnB & Soul 
|
|-
| Best Female Artiste Southern Africa 
|  
|-
|Herself 
|Breakout Artist of the Year
|

Basadi in Music Awards 

!
|-
|rowspan="3"|2022
|rowspan="2"|Herself 
|Artist of the Year
|
|rowspan="3"|
|-
|Kaya959 Afropop Artist of the Year 
|
|-
|"Phakade Lami"
|Song of the Year 
|

South African Music Awards 

!
|-
|rowspan="3"|2022
|rowspan="2"|"Phakade Lami"
| Music Video of the Year 
|
|rowspan="2"|
|-
| Record of the Year 
|
|-
|Amagama
| Best Afro Pop Album 
|
|

References 

Living people
2000 births
South African songwriters
21st-century South African women singers
People from KwaZulu-Natal
University of KwaZulu-Natal alumni
Universal Music Group artists